Shelia Conover (born May 11, 1963) is an American sprint canoer who was born in California, who competed from the mid-1980s to the early 1990s. Competing in three Summer Olympics, she earned her best finish of fourth in the K-4 500 m event at Los Angeles in 1984.

References
Sports-Reference.com profile

1963 births
American female canoeists
Canoeists at the 1984 Summer Olympics
Canoeists at the 1988 Summer Olympics
Canoeists at the 1992 Summer Olympics
Living people
Olympic canoeists of the United States
21st-century American women